"Some Like It Hot" is a song by British-American band the Power Station. It was the first single released from the group's 1985 eponymous debut album. Released by Parlophone Records in 1985, the song features loud, prominent drum beats from Tony Thompson and lead vocals from Robert Palmer.  The video featured model Caroline Cossey (also known as Tula). It was the band's biggest hit, peaking at number six on the US Billboard Hot 100 chart and number four in Australia.

Background
Bassist John Taylor said on the creation of the song: "What we really wanted to do was put this drummer out there in a way that we felt he deserved, so that song particularly was sort of designed to really showcase Tony. I flew to Nassau in the Bahamas, which was where Robert Palmer lived at the time, and played him the demo that Andy and I had written and said, 'We've got this idea that we're calling "Some Like It Hot."' And he just looked at me and said, 'And some sweat when the heat is on.' I was, like, 'Yes! That'll do...'"

The Power Station were living a lavish, drug-fueled lifestyle during the recording of the album, which made focusing difficult. "I had to be, like, strapped to the desk if I was gonna get a bass line finished, because I was just all over the place," John Taylor said.

Track listings
UK and US 7-inch single
 "Some Like It Hot"  – 3:45
 "The Heat Is On"  – 3:20

UK and US 12-inch single
 "Some Like It Hot and the Heat Is On"  – 6:36
 "Some Like It Hot"  – 3:45
 "The Heat Is On"  – 3:20
 also released as a 12-inch picture disc in the UK

Charts

Weekly charts

Year-end charts

In popular culture
"Some Like It Hot" was used for CBS Daytime advertising campaigns in 1985 and 2022.  The song was also used in the films National Lampoon's European Vacation and Hello Ladies: The Movie and in the TV shows Family Guy, Will & Grace and The Carrie Diaries.

References

1985 debut singles
1985 songs
Capitol Records singles
Funk rock songs
Parlophone singles
Song recordings produced by Bernard Edwards
Songs written by Andy Taylor (guitarist)
Songs written by John Taylor (bass guitarist)
Songs written by Robert Palmer (singer)
The Power Station (band) songs